Roland Rohlfs (February 10, 1892 – February 28, 1974) was an American aviator.

Biography
Roland Rohlfs was born in Buffalo, New York on February 10, 1892, the son of Anna Katharine Green, the crime novelist; and Charles Rohlfs, the actor and furniture craftsman.

Rohlfs flew a hydro-aeroplane called the "Dunkirk Fighter" for Curtiss Aeroplane and Motor Company in 1918. Later that year he broke the flight airspeed record while flying a Curtiss Wasp, his speed was clocked at 163.1 mph (262.4 km/h).

In 1919 he broke another world record when he flew to an altitude of 34,610 feet in a Curtiss L-3 triplane (at - 47 degrees Fahrenheit).

He died on February 28, 1974.

See also
 History of aviation

References

1892 births
1974 deaths
American aviation record holders
Members of the Early Birds of Aviation
People from Buffalo, New York